Anne Saunders may refer to:

Anne Cofell Saunders, American television writer and producer
Ann Loreille Saunders, British historian and editor

See also
Saunders (surname)